Shook Ones may refer to:

Shook Ones (band), an American musical group
"Shook Ones" (song), a 1994 song by Mobb Deep
"Shook Ones (Part II)", a 1995 song by Mobb Deep
"Shook Ones Pt. II", an episode of American TV series Euphoria